Yan'an Nanniwan Airport  is a dual-use military and public airport serving the city of Yan'an in northern Shaanxi Province.

Yan'an was formerly served by Yan'an Ershilipu Airport. In 2002, the Yan'an city government proposed the construction of a new airport to replace Ershilipu and it was approved by the Chinese national government in 2009. Nanniwan Airport was opened on 8 November 2018 with an inaugural China Eastern Airlines flight from Hangzhou Xiaoshan International Airport, and all civil flights were transferred to Nanniwan from Ershilipu Airport.

Facilities 
It is projected to serve 1 million passengers and 800 tons of cargo annually by 2020.

Airlines and destinations

See also
List of airports in China
List of the busiest airports in China

References 

Airports in Shaanxi
Yan'an
Airports established in 2018
2018 establishments in China
Chinese Air Force bases
Baota District